Yilan crater is an impact crater in China, situated to the northwest of the town of Yilan in Heilongjiang province. Its southern rim has eroded, but its northern rim is visible on the surface as a crescent-shaped ridge. Radiocarbon dating shows its age to be only 46,100 to 52,500 years.

References

Landforms of Heilongjiang
Impact craters of Asia